"I Don't Care" is a 1955 song written by Webb Pierce and Cindy Walker and originally performed by Pierce.  The song spent twelve weeks at number one on the C&W Best Seller charts and spent a total of 32 weeks on the charts.  "The B-side of "I Don't Care" a song entitled, "Your Good for Nothing Heart" spent six weeks on the Juke Box and C&W Jockey charts.

Ricky Skaggs version

In April 1982, the song was released by American country music artist Ricky Skaggs as the fourth single from his album Waitin' for the Sun to Shine.  It went to number one on the country charts for one week and was his second song to top the charts.

Weekly charts

Year-end charts

References

1955 singles
1982 singles
Webb Pierce songs
Ricky Skaggs songs
Songs written by Webb Pierce
Songs written by Cindy Walker
Song recordings produced by Ricky Skaggs
Decca Records singles
Epic Records singles
1955 songs